Sybi Hida is a member of the Assembly of the Republic of Albania for the Democratic Party of Albania.
He has been working for Ministry of Finance for a long period, and he is one of the top experts in macroeconomic and fiscal policies in Albania.

References

Living people
Democratic Party of Albania politicians
Members of the Parliament of Albania
21st-century Albanian politicians
Year of birth missing (living people)